The Providence Stadium or Guyana National Stadium is a sports stadium in Guyana, replacing Bourda as the national stadium. The stadium was built specifically to host Super Eight matches in the 2007 Cricket World Cup held in March and April 2007.

The stadium hosted six World Cup matches between March 28, 2007 and April 9, 2007, most notably the match between Sri Lanka and South Africa in which Sri Lankan fast bowler Lasith Malinga became the first bowler in international cricket history to take four wickets in four consecutive balls. Built primarily for cricket matches, the stadium can be converted into a multi-use facility.

History
Built for the 2007 ICC Cricket World Cup, the stadium hosted six One Day Internationals as part of that competition, all at the Super Eights stage. As of June 2016, it has hosted ten more ODI games since the 2007 World Cup including a historic three Day/Night matches during the 2016 Tri Series involving West Indies, Australia and South Africa. This series represents the first time that every ODI match is played under floodlights in the Caribbean.

Providence hosted its first Test Match in 2008, with Sri Lanka as the visiting team, but didn't host another Test until May 2011, when the West Indies defeated Pakistan. It was also one of the venues for the 2010 ICC World Twenty20, hosting six group stage matches, including 2 matches involving the West Indies.

It has also hosted other sports other than cricket including football and also hosted the rugby sevens competition at the 2010 Central American and Caribbean Games. The opening and closing ceremonies as well as the numerous super concerts held for Carifesta10 were also hosted there. With the advent of the Caribbean Premier League the stadium became the home ground for the Guyana Amazon Warriors franchise hosting league matches in each of the first three seasons.

The stadium was built by the Government of Guyana with substantial financial assistance from the Government of India.  It was designed by R.K. & Associates (Ram Kishan and Associates - Architects, Engineers, Planners) and constructed by Shapoorji Pallonji Group.  Flooding in 2005 slowed site preparation, and delayed the start of construction, which began in May 2005.  Construction costs are estimated at $25,000,000 US.

Seating 15,000 people, Providence Stadium is one of the largest sports arenas in Guyana, and now hosts test cricket instead of Bourda. The complex includes a shopping mall and luxury apartments. Princess International Hotel is located next to the stadium.

Transport
Providence Stadium is located on the east bank of the Demerara River a few kilometres south of the Guyanese capital, Georgetown. Located along the East Bank Highway the stadium is a ten-minute drive from Georgetown's city centre and a 30-minute drive from Cheddi Jagan International Airport.

Records

Tests
Providence Stadium has hosted two test matches against Sri Lanka and Pakistan in 2008 and 2011 respectively. The records for batting and bowling after these two matches are:
Highest Team Score - 476/8 dec. Sri Lanka vs West Indies
Highest Individual Score - 136 by Mahela Jayawardene
Lowest Team Score - 152 all out West Indies vs Pakistan
Best Bowling in an Innings - 6/42 by Saeed Ajmal Pakistan vs West Indies
Best Bowling in a Match - 11/111 by Saeed Ajmal  Pakistan vs West Indies

ODIs
There has been nineteen (19) ODIs played at the Providence Stadium since it was built. The most recent match was in April 2017 when West Indies played Pakistan in the last of three ODIs at the ground. 
Highest Team Score - 309/6 West Indies vs Pakistan
Highest Individual Score - 130* by Tamim Iqbal Bangladesh  vs West Indies
Lowest Team Score - 98 West Indies vs Pakistan
Most Runs - 314 (5 Innings) Shivnarine Chanderpaul 
Best Bowling in an Innings - 7/12 by Shahid Afridi Pakistan vs West Indies
Most Wickets - 12 (4 Matches) Sunil Narine

T20Is
The ground has hosted six (6) Twenty20 Internationals all in the 2010 T20 World Cup. 
Highest Team Score - 191/5 England vs West Indies
Highest Individual Score - 100 by Mahela Jayawardene Sri Lanka vs Zimbabwe
Most Runs - 181 (2 Innings) Mahela Jayawardene 
Best Bowling in an Innings - 3/5 Scott Styris New Zealand vs Zimbabwe
Most Wickets - 5 (2 Matches) Darren Sammy

List of five-wicket hauls

Providence Stadium has seen 10 international five-wicket hauls taken on the ground. Four of these have been taken in Test matches, five in ODIs and one in a women's T20I match.

Test matches

One Day Internationals

Twenty20 Internationals

See also
 List of Test cricket grounds

Notes

References

External links 

 Providence Stadium at ESPNcricinfo
 Providence Stadium at CricketArchive

Test cricket grounds in the West Indies
Cricket grounds in Guyana
Football venues in Guyana
Music venues in Guyana
2007 Cricket World Cup stadiums